This is a list of Regions of Kazakhstan by Human Development Index as of 2023 with data for the year 2021.

References

Kazakhstan
regions, Human Development Index
Kazakhstan, Human Development Index